Fitzwatertown is an unincorporated community located in Montgomery County, Pennsylvania, in the United States.

Fitzwatertown is located at the intersection of Limekiln Pike, Fitzwatertown Road and Jenkintown Road.

Bean's 1884 History of Montgomery County, Pennsylvania describes Fitzwatertown as follows:

Fitzwatertown is situated in the southern part of the township, on the Limekiln turnpike, in the midst of the fertile valley of Sandy Run, abounding in limestone and iron-ore.  This is an old settlement where Thomas Fitzwater followed lime-burning before the summer of 1705 and had a grist-mill erected at an early period.  It contains a store hotel, wheel-wright and blacksmith-shop, grist-mill and about twelve house.   The post-office was established here before 1858.  The value of lime produced in Upper Dublin for 1840 was stated to be twenty thousand two hundred and seventy-five dollars, which was all produced in this vicinity, but the business has since been greatly increased through railroad facilities.  Edge Hill Station, of the North Pennsylvania Railroad, is only a mile distant; yet, with all its surpassing advantages, as may be observed, has made but very little progress for the last half-century.  The grist-mill mentioned was long carried on by John Price and is now, owned by Samuel Conard.  Sandy Run is a steady stream rising at the Moreland line, about three miles distant.

References

External links
Upper Dublin Township
Upper Dublin School District

Upper Dublin Township, Montgomery County, Pennsylvania
Unincorporated communities in Montgomery County, Pennsylvania
Unincorporated communities in Pennsylvania
1705 establishments in Pennsylvania